Suketoshi (written: 資俊) is a masculine Japanese given name. Notable people with the name include:

 (1872–1947), Japanese leprologist
 (1660–1723), Japanese daimyō
 (1720–1764), Japanese daimyō

Japanese masculine given names